Lucian Charles Usher-Wilson CBE (10 January 190328 August 1984) was a British Anglican bishop who served in Uganda during the mid-20th century and afterwards in England.

Usher-Wilson was educated at Lincoln College, Oxford. He was ordained deacon in 1927 and priest in 1939. He was a teacher at King's College, Budo from 1927 to 1933; and a CMS missionary until his appointment to succeed Arthur Kitching as diocesan Bishop on the Upper Nile in 1936. He was consecrated as a bishop on 28 October 1936, at St Paul's Cathedral by Cosmo Lang, Archbishop of Canterbury. 

Under his initiative, the Diocese on the Upper Nile was split in 1961 and Usher-Wilson remained as diocesan bishop of one part, afterwards called the Diocese of Mbale (so he became the first Bishop of Mbale); he resigned that See in 1964 and became Vicar of Churt and an Assistant Bishop of Guildford. On his retirement to Westbury-on-Trym in 1972, he was the longest-serving bishop at the time in any Anglican church; he became an honorary assistant bishop in the Diocese of Bristol. He was appointed a Commander of the Order of the British Empire (CBE).

References

20th-century Anglican bishops in Uganda
Commanders of the Order of the British Empire
Anglican bishops on the Upper Nile
Anglican bishops of Mbale
1903 births
1984 deaths
Alumni of Lincoln College, Oxford